Positive Thinking may refer to:

 Optimism, a mental attitude or world view that interprets situations and events as being best
 New Thought, a 19th-century American movement asserting the power of positive thinking
 Positive Thinking..., a 1998 album by Acoustic Alchemy
 Positive Thinking, a 2016 album by The Pack A.D.
 "Positive Thinking", a song by Morecambe and Wise
 Positive Thinking (magazine), a now defunct magazine launched in 2005

See also
The Power of Positive Thinking, a self-help book by Norman Vincent Peale, originally published in 1952